Pavel Vrána (born 1 January 2001) is a professional Czech football player, who currently plays for FC Kralovice.

References

External links
 
 

Czech footballers
1985 births
Living people
Footballers from Brno
Czech First League players
Slovak Super Liga players
FC Zbrojovka Brno players
1. FC Slovácko players
FC Nitra players
FK Dukla Prague players
MFK Karviná players
FK Dukla Banská Bystrica players
Expatriate footballers in Slovakia
Association football forwards